Travis Michael Flores (born April 7, 1991) is an American writer, activist, philanthropist, and internationally recognized motivational speaker. He is a published children's book author, and has written for several magazines and publications including "OUT," "UpWorthy," and "DoSomething," among many more. He has been featured in works such as Chicken Soup for the Soul, Reader's Digest: Selections, Charlie's Cancer Rescue and The Lemonade Stand. Flores has cystic fibrosis and has spoken very openly about it, having served as a spokesperson for various cystic fibrosis related organizations and fundraisers. He is very passionate about his charitable work with both the Make-A-Wish Foundation and the Cystic Fibrosis Foundation, and has donated a large percentage of his children's book proceeds to the two organizations. Throughout his life and career, he has helped to raise mass amounts of money for both the Cystic Fibrosis Foundation and Make-A-Wish, among other charities including the Christina Grimmie Foundation, Global Genes, etc. Flores also established his own 501(c)(3) organization in 2005, which provides laptops to chronically ill youth in hospitals.

When Flores was twelve years old, he began work with illustrator Michelle Ciappa to prepare his children's book, "The Spider Who Never Gave Up'''', for publishing. In 2004, after the book was published when Flores was thirteen, he began a motivational speaking / book tour. In the same year, June 18 was proclaimed by Mayor Michael Mullen as "Travis Flores Day" in Marietta, Ohio; a city near his hometown of Newport, Ohio. A year later, Flores partnered with Disney to print an edition of his book for a Make-A-Wish Foundation event, in which two million dollars was donated to the charity.Disneyland Park Update, Mouse Planet, Staff Writer, 2005 The media attention and success of the event enabled Flores to extend his tour another two years.

Flores started college when he was sixteen years old and received his bachelor's degree in acting from Marymount Manhattan College by the age of twenty. In 2010, during his work as an undergraduate student, he had the opportunity to work with Susan Batson on the Broadway workshops of the Tennessee Williams play, In Masks Outrageous and Austere''. In 2012, the play opened at Culture Project theater in New York City, but Flores was no longer affiliated with the project. While working in New York City, he attended New York University and graduated in Spring of 2013 with a master's degree in Fundraising.

On March 3, 2015, Flores successfully received a double-lung transplant at Ronald Reagan UCLA Medical Center. Following the operation, he continued his work in entertainment and later underwent a second double-lung transplant on October 3, 2017, at the same medical facility. In January 2019, his second transplant was rejected by his body. For more than a year, he advocated for himself, with his team at UCLA, to be approved by his insurance for a third double-lung transplant. On May 5, 2020, Flores received his third bilateral lung transplant, making him 1 of approximately 30 worldwide to have ever undergone 3 double-lung transplants.

In May 2019, Flores came out as gay on the CW series MyLastDays, making him the first person to ever come out on the network.

Flores currently resides in Los Angeles, California with his partner, Clément Souyri. He continues to pursue his philanthropic outreaches, acting, and writing. His parents, Timothy and Teresa Flores, as well as his two siblings, Justin and Brandon Flores, live in Ohio.

References

External links 
 Official website

1991 births
Activists from California
American motivational speakers
American philanthropists
American children's writers
American gay actors
American gay writers
Living people
LGBT people from California
Lung transplant recipients
Male actors from California
Marymount Manhattan College alumni
New York University alumni
People from Glendale, California